George Kuwa (born Keichii Kuwahara) was a Japanese and American Issei (Japanese immigrant) film actor of the silent era.  He appeared in more than 50 films between 1916 and 1931. He was the first actor to portray Charlie Chan on-screen in the 1926 film serial The House Without a Key.

Biography 
According to contemporaneous reports, Kuwa was born in Hiroshima, Japan. His father was a judge and wanted George to follow suit. Kuwa moved to the U.S. around 1916 or 1917 and began a career in Hollywood. Like many Japanese actors of the era, he often played Chinese characters. He made several films in Japan as well before returning to the U.S.; he died in Los Angeles in 1931 at the age of 46.

Partial filmography

 The Soul of Kura San (1916)
 The Yellow Pawn (1916)
 The Bottle Imp (1917)
 The Countess Charming (1917)
 Rimrock Jones (1918)
 The Woman in the Web (1918)
 Toby's Bow (1919)
 The Willow Tree (1920)
 Sick Abed (1920)
 The Round-Up (1920)
 Officer 666 (1920)
 Midsummer Madness (1921)
 The Invisible Fear (1921)
 Nobody's Fool (1921)
 Five Days to Live (1922)
 Moran of the Lady Letty (1922)
 Bought and Paid For (1922)
 Sherlock Brown (1922)
 The Half Breed (1922)
 Enter Madame (1922)
 The Beautiful and Damned (1922)
 The World's Applause (1923)
 Daddy (1923)
 The Eternal Struggle (1923)
 The Storm Daughter (1924)
 Curlytop (1924)
 The Man from Wyoming (1924)
 Broken Barriers (1924)
 Oh Doctor! (1925)
 Head Winds (1925)
 A Son of His Father (1925)
 The Enchanted Hill (1926)
 A Trip to Chinatown (1926)
 The Dice Woman (1926)
 The Silver Treasure (1926)
 The Nutcracker (1926)
 That Model from Paris (1926)
 The House Without a Key (1926)
 Melting Millions (1927)
 Perch of the Devil (1927)
 White Pants Willie (1927)
 The Night Bride (1927)
 The Chinese Parrot (1927)
 The Warning (1927)
 The Secret Hour (1928)
 The Showdown (1928)
 Chinatown Charlie (1928)
 After the Storm (1928)
 Wicked (1931)

References

External links

1885 births
1931 deaths
Japanese male film actors
Japanese male silent film actors
Japanese emigrants to the United States
American male actors of Japanese descent
American male film actors
American film actors of Asian descent
20th-century American male actors
20th-century Japanese male actors